Liam Bennett (1950–2006) was a former Wexford senior hurler. He was a Faythe Harriers club member and was a member of the Model side that reached successive All-Ireland finals in 1976 and 1977. He also won the All-Ireland minor final in 1968. He was a popular painter and sign-writer and was also a keen cyclist. He fell suddenly ill while out cycling and later died at Wexford General Hospital.

1950 births
2006 deaths
Faythe Harriers hurlers
Wexford inter-county hurlers
All-Ireland Senior Hurling Championship winners